Hubert Roosevelt Wilson (September 19, 1902 – October 21, 1981), nicknamed "Tack", was an American Negro league pitcher in the 1920s.

A native of Van Alstyne, Texas, Wilson attended Texas College. He pitched for the Kansas City Monarchs in 1928 and 1929, posting an 8–2 record with a 3.21 ERA in 17 recorded games over the two seasons. Wilson died in Houston, Texas in 1981 at age 79.

References

External links
 and Seamheads

1902 births
1981 deaths
Kansas City Monarchs players
Baseball pitchers
Baseball players from Texas
People from Van Alstyne, Texas
20th-century African-American sportspeople